The Arndale Board is a high-power single-board computer featuring the ARM Cortex-A15 MPCore developed in South Korea.

Overview 

The Arndale Board is composed of four parts: the CPU Board, Base Board, Sound Board, and Connectivity Board.

Hardware specifications

References

External links 
 

Single-board computers